The 2010 Canoe Slalom World Cup was a series of five races in 5 canoeing and kayaking categories organized by the International Canoe Federation (ICF). It was the 23rd edition and it marked the first time that women competed for the single canoe world cup points and title. The series consisted of 2 continental championships (Oceania and Asia) which were open to all countries and 3 world cup races. The athletes gained points for their results in the three world cup races plus their best result from any of the two continental championships.

Calendar

Final standings 

The winner of each race was awarded 60 points. Points for lower places differed from one category to another. Every participant was guaranteed at least 2 points for participation and 5 points for qualifying for the semifinal run.

Results

Oceania Canoe Slalom Open 

The Oceania Canoe Slalom Open took place in Penrith, Australia on February 19–21. Five different countries have won a gold medal at the event. Slovakia was the most successful with a gold and two silvers. Home paddlers from Australia have won one gold and two bronze medals.

2010 Asian Canoe Slalom Championships 

The 2010 Asian Canoe Slalom Championships took place in Xiasi, China on May 1–3. Chinese paddlers won 4 out of the 5 events and added 5 silvers and 3 bronzes.

World Cup Race 1 

The first regular world cup race took place in Prague, Czech Republic on June 18–20. China topped the medal table with 2 golds and a silver. Czech paddlers took one medal of each color.

World Cup Race 2 

The penultimate race of the series took place in La Seu d'Urgell, Spain on June 26–27. Five different nations won gold with Slovakia adding 2 silver medals to top the medal table. Spain had a gold and a bronze.

World Cup Race 3 

The final world cup race was held in Augsburg, Germany on July 2–4. The home German paddlers won 4 out of 5 events and added 1 silver and 2 bronze medals.

References

External links 
 International Canoe Federation

Canoe Slalom World Cup
Canoe Slalom World Cup